"Broken Down in Tiny Pieces" is a song written by John Adrian., and recorded by American country singer Billy "Crash" Craddock, with Janie Fricke performing background vocals on the song. It was released in October 1976 as the first single from the album Crash. The song stayed at number one for one week and spend twelve weeks within the top 40.

Chart performance

Covers
Billy Joe Royal also recorded a version of the song.

References

1976 singles
Billy "Crash" Craddock songs
Song recordings produced by Ron Chancey